Osteoclast-associated immunoglobulin-like receptor is a protein that in humans is encoded by the OSCAR gene.

Osteoclasts are multinucleated cells that resorb bone and are essential for bone homeostasis. This gene encodes an osteoclast-associated receptor (OSCAR), which is a member of the leukocyte receptor complex (LRC) protein family that plays critical roles in the regulation of both innate and adaptive immune responses. Different from the other LRC members, OSCAR expression is detected specifically in preosteoclasts or mature osteoclasts. OSCAR may be an important bone-specific regulator of osteoclast differentiation. Multiple alternatively spliced transcript variants encoding different isoforms have been found for this gene.

References

Further reading